Hédi Teraoui (born 10 November 1989) is a Tunisian racewalker who specialises in the 20 kilometres walk. He represented his country at the 2011 World Championships in Athletics and competed twice at the IAAF World Race Walking Cup. He was the champion at the 2012 African Championships in Athletics and runner-up at the 2011 All-Africa Games.

His best of 19:51.36 minutes for the 5000 metres race walk indoors is the African record for the distance. His personal best for the 20 km event is 1:23:25 hours.

He won his first international medal at the 2008 Arab Junior Athletics Championships, taking the 10,000 m walk gold medal. He competed at the 2008 World Junior Championships in Athletics that same year and came seventh.

Teraoui missed the 2015 season.

International competitions

See also
List of champions of the African Championships in Athletics

References

Living people
1989 births
Tunisian male racewalkers
World Athletics Championships athletes for Tunisia
African Games silver medalists for Tunisia
African Games medalists in athletics (track and field)
Athletes (track and field) at the 2011 All-Africa Games
Athletes (track and field) at the 2009 Mediterranean Games
Mediterranean Games competitors for Tunisia
20th-century Tunisian people
21st-century Tunisian people